Contiloe Pictures Pvt Ltd., formerly known as Contiloe Films from 1995 until 2008 and Contiloe Entertainment from 2008 until 2015 is an Indian production company. It was founded by Abhimanyu Singh and Aditya Narain Singh in 1995. It has produced successful shows like  Jhansi Ki Rani, Adaalat, Bharat Ka Veer Putra – Maharana Pratap, Chakravartin Ashoka Samrat, and Vighnaharta Ganesh.

Productions

Movies

References

External links
 Official Website

Television production companies of India
Entertainment companies of India
Mass media companies based in Mumbai
Indian companies established in 1995
Mass media companies established in 1995
1995 establishments in Maharashtra